Valera A. Stevens is an American politician from Washington. Stevens is a Republican and a former member of the Washington House of Representatives and Washington State Senate.

Career 
Stevens is an interior decorator.

On November 3, 1992, Stevens won the election and became a Republican member of Washington House of Representatives for District 39, Position 1. Stevens defeated Dennis Lebow with 52.44% of the votes. On November 8, 1994, as an incumbent, Stevens won the election and continued serving District 39, Position 1. Stevens defeated Steve Hobbs with 63.84% of the votes.

On November 5, 1996, Stevens won the election and became a Republican member of Washington State Senate for District 39. Stevens defeated Patricia Patterson with 55.23% of the votes. On November 7, 2000, as an incumbent, Stevens won the election and continued serving District 39. Stevens defeated Freda Smith and Craig Chase with 54.94% of the votes. On November 2, 2004, as an incumbent, Stevens won the election and continued serving District 39. Stevens defeated Susanne Olson with 54.33% of the votes. On November 4, 2008, as an incumbent, Stevens won the election and continued serving District 39. Stevens defeated Fred Walser with 58.55% of the votes.

Personal life 
Stevens' husband is Keith. They have two children. Stevens and her family live in Olympia, Washington.

References

External links 
 Val Stevens at ballotpedia.org
 Valera "Val" Stevens at ourcampaigns.com

American women interior designers
Living people
Women state legislators in Washington (state)
Republican Party members of the Washington House of Representatives
People from Olympia, Washington
Republican Party Washington (state) state senators
Year of birth missing (living people)
20th-century American politicians
20th-century American women politicians
21st-century American politicians
21st-century American women politicians